Peschanovka is a rural locality (a khutor) in Ozerkinskoye Rural Settlement, Kikvidzensky District, Volgograd Oblast, Russia. The population was 50 as of 2010.

Geography 
Peschanovka is located in steppe, on Khopyorsko-Buzulukskaya plain, on the right bank of the Buzuluk River, 12 km northeast of Preobrazhenskaya (the district's administrative centre) by road. Semyonovka is the nearest rural locality.

References 

Rural localities in Kikvidzensky District